Park Plaza may refer to:

Hotels
 Boston Park Plaza, former Statler Hotel
 Park Plaza Hotel (Los Angeles), 1920s art deco building in downtown Los Angeles, near MacArthur Park.
 Park Plaza Hotel (Toronto), former name of the Park Hyatt Toronto, Canada

Hotel chains
 Park Plaza Hotels & Resorts, international hotel chain owned by Radisson Hotel Group, with PPHE Hotel Group was licensed to use the name
 PPHE Hotel Group, formerly Park Plaza Hotels Europe and Park Plaza Hotels Limited, a listed company
 Park Plaza Hotel Leeds, also known as Royal Exchange House, England, part of Park Plaza Hotels & Resorts hotel chain and operated by PPHE Hotel Group
 Park Plaza Victoria Amsterdam, part of Park Plaza Hotels & Resorts hotel chain and operated by PPHE Hotel Group
 Park Plaza Westminster Bridge, part of Park Plaza Hotels & Resorts hotel chain and operated by PPHE Hotel Group

Film
 Park Plaza 605, 1953 British crime film

Buildings
 Park Plaza Apartments (Lexington, Kentucky), 21 story residential high-rise
 Park Plaza Apartments (New York), prominent art deco apartment buildings erected in the Bronx
 Park Plaza Apartments (Sydney), 20 story residential high rise in Hurstville, NSW
 Park Plaza Condominiums, residential high-rise building complex in Albuquerque, New Mexico
 Park Plaza Mall, upscale shopping center in midtown Little Rock, Arkansas
 Pacific Park Plaza, 30 story residential tower in Emeryville, California
 SCB Park Plaza, or Siam Commercial Bank Park Plaza, a high-rise building complex in the Chatuchak district of Bangkok, Thailand